The Nøstvet culture (c. 6200 BC – 3200 BC) and the Lihult culture are two very similar Mesolithic cultures in Scandinavian prehistory derived from the earlier Fosna-Hensbacka cultures. They are so varied and vaguely defined that they are rather a tradition than an archaeological culture. 

The Nøstvet culture appeared around the Oslofjord and along the Norwegian coast up to Trøndelag, whereas the Lihult culture is found in western coastal Sweden. Sometimes the Sandarna culture appears as the name of an intermediary form between the Swedish Hensbacka and Lihult cultures. This name comes from a settlement near Gothenburg (approximately 7000 BC–5000 BC).

The Nøstvet people lived on open settlements. They used honed axes and microliths of various rocks, such as quartz, quartzite and flint. They lived primarily of hunting various animals such as seafowl and marine mammals, in addition to fishing and gathering. The size of the settlements grows over time, which reflects an increase in population and a more sedentary lifestyle.

In southern Scandinavia, its neighbours were first the Kongemose culture (roughly 6000 BC–5200 BC) and later on the Ertebølle culture (about 5200 BC–4000 BC).

About 4000 BC, the Nøstvet and Lihult cultures are succeeded by the Funnelbeaker culture and disappear from the archaeological record.

Genetics

References
Nationalencyklopedin

Mesolithic cultures of Europe
Archaeological cultures of Northern Europe
Archaeological cultures in Norway
Archaeological cultures in Sweden
Scandinavian archaeology
Nordic Stone Age